Guido Pella was the defending champion but chose not to defend his title.

Laslo Đere won the title after defeating Gianluca Mager 6–2, 6–1 in the final.

Seeds

Draw

Finals

Top half

Bottom half

References
Main Draw
Qualifying Draw

Aspria Tennis Cup - Singles
2018 Singles